Jeff Dutch is an American curler and curling coach.

Record as a coach of national teams

References

External links 

Living people
American male curlers
American curling coaches
Year of birth missing (living people)